Lee County School District is a public school district based in Marianna, Arkansas, United States. The Lee County School District encompasses  of land in Lee County and provides early childhood, elementary and secondary education for more than 1,100 prekindergarten through grade 12 students at its three facilities.

Lee County School District and all of its schools are accredited by the Arkansas Department of Education (ADE).

The district serves all of Lee County, including the municipalities of Mariana, Aubrey, Haynes, LaGrange, Moro, and Rondo. It also serves the unincorporated area of Brickeys.

History 
In 1965 the Haynes School District merged into the Marianna School District.

In 1967 the Aubrey, Brickeys, and Moro school districts all merged into the Marianna district.

Schools 
 Lee High School—grades 9 through 12.
 Anna Strong Middle School—grades 3 through 6.
 Whitten Elementary School—prekindergarten through grade 2.

Anna Strong Middle School is named in honor of Anna Mae Paschal Strong, a native Arkansan, educator and retired principal of Robert R. Moton High School.  Mrs. Strong, was a noted African-American teacher and principal who served as president of the Arkansas Teachers Association.

References

Further reading 
  (Download) - Includes maps of predecessor districts

External links 
 

School districts in Arkansas
Education in Lee County, Arkansas